Ke'Ke' is the first extended play from R&B singer Keke Wyatt. It came out three years after her third studio album, Unbelievable. It features five newly-written and produced songs, including the mildly successful single, "Fall in Love".

"Fall in Love" reached 20 on the Bubbling Under Hot 100, and No. 17 on the Hot R&B/Hip-Hop Singles & Tracks chart. On the R&B Albums chart, the EP peaked at No. 12 in late June 2014.  The EP has sold 20,000 copies in the US as of April 2016.

Track listing

Charts

References

External links

2014 debut EPs
Keke Wyatt albums